Savaria may refer to:

 Savaria or Sabaria, the Roman name of the city of Szombathely, Hungary
 Sarvaiya, a Rajput clan of India
 Saawariya, a Bollywood film
 Sabariya, a Dravidian clan of Chhattisghar